The Pearl is a novella by the American author John Steinbeck. The story, first published in 1947, follows a pearl diver, Kino, and explores man’s purpose as well as greed, defiance of societal norms, and evil. Steinbeck's inspiration was a Mexican folk tale from La Paz, Baja California Sur, Mexico, which he had heard in a visit to the formerly pearl-rich region in 1940.

The book was adapted as a Mexican film named La Perla (1947) and as a cult Kannada movie Ondu Muttina Kathe (1987). The story is one of Steinbeck's most popular books and has been widely used in middle and high school classes. The Pearl is sometimes considered a parable.

Plot 

Kino, a poor pearl fisherman, lives with his wife Juana and their infant son Coyotito in La Paz, Baja California Sur. Kino sees a scorpion crawl down one of the ropes holding up the hanging box that serves as Coyotito's crib and tries to remove it. However, Coyotito shakes the rope, causing the scorpion to fall into the box and sting him. Kino and Juana visit the local doctor, but are turned away because of their poverty and his prejudices toward Amerindians.

As Juana applies a seaweed poultice to the sting, Kino dives for oysters from his canoe, hoping to find a pearl valuable enough to cover the treatment fee. One oyster yields an immense pearl, which he calls "The Pearl of the World"; news of its discovery spreads quickly, and some of the family's neighbors start to resent Kino's luck in finding it. Unaware of these reactions, Kino envisions selling the pearl and using the money to improve his family's lives. The doctor visits them to treat Coyotito, even though the baby seems to be recovering, and Kino promises to pay him after selling the pearl. 

That night, Kino drives off a thief who attempts to break into his house. Juana warns him that the pearl will destroy the family, but Kino insists that it is their only chance for a better life. He goes to sell it the next day, not knowing that all the pearl dealers in La Paz are working for a single buyer and conspiring to keep prices low. Pretending that Kino's pearl is of poor quality, they make offers of 1,500 pesos at most; he angrily rejects them, believing the pearl to be worth 50,000 pesos, and vows to sell it in the capital instead. 

More thieves attack him that night, but he remains resolved to make the journey despite Juana's warning that the pearl is evil and her suggestions to get rid of it. After he forcibly stops her from throwing it into the ocean, he is attacked again; Kino kills one man in self-defense, and he and Juana hurriedly flee with Coyotito to avoid any reprisals. Discovering that Kino's canoe has been damaged and their house looted and burned in search of the pearl, the family takes refuge with Kino's brother and his wife before setting out for the capital the following night.

As they travel, Kino spots a trio of men following them and Juana realizes that their intent is to take the pearl and kill the entire family. Leaving the road they have been using, Kino leads Juana into the mountains in order to leave fewer signs of their passage. They take shelter in a cave, only for the trackers to make camp by a pool of water below them. As Kino sneaks down to ambush the trio, one of them hears a cry and fires his rifle in its direction, thinking it to be a coyote pup. Kino attacks and kills all three men, then discovers that the shot has killed Coyotito.

Kino and Juana return to La Paz with their son's body. After looking at the pearl one last time and seeing its surface reflect images of all the disasters that have befallen him, Kino throws it into the ocean.

Setting 
Steinbeck began writing the story as a movie script in 1944 and first published it as a short story called "The Pearl of the World" in the Woman's Home Companion (December 1945). The original publication is also sometimes listed as "The Pearl of La Paz". Steinbeck expanded the story to novella length and published it under the name The Pearl (1947), published by Viking Press. As he was writing the novella version, he was frequently travelling to Mexico where the film version, co-written with Jack Wagner, was being filmed. The film was also released by RKO in 1947 as a co-promotion with the book.

In 2001, The Pearl was loosely adapted as a film directed by Alfredo Zacharias, starring Lukas Haas and Richard Harris, which was released directly to video in 2005.

The book takes place in La Paz, Baja California, Mexico. Unlike many of Steinbeck’s other works, it does not take place in the U.S state of California.

Themes
Family – One of the major themes in the novel is family. Throughout the novel, the plot discusses how the family lives before and after the pearl. It is the constant focus of the plot and many of the decisions are based on what would be best for the family. For example, the first thing that Kino desires to do with the money from the pearl is to give his wife and Coyotito a better life. This money would pay for Coyotito’s education, better clothes, and better protection. Later, Kino also demonstrates devotion to his family by not selling to the pearl dealer. The second buyer was trying to get the pearl for less than it was worth, but Kino, with his family in mind, declined to search for a better deal. He always has his family in mind, whether it leads to warmth and happiness or destruction. It was the reason Kino got the pearl and, eventually, the reason why he threw it back into the ocean.

Good and Evil – One of the biggest themes in this novel is the one between good and evil. This theme is displayed in other themes as well and it is shown from the beginning to the end. In the beginning, Kino lives a life of simplicity and happiness but when he discovers the pearl, he believes that good will come from it. However, a sense of evil accompanies it. After that, Kino and his family were in a constant battle against evil to preserve the good that they enjoyed before.

Paradox – The theme of paradox is displayed through Kino’s desires. Once Kino discovers the pearl, he begins to dream about what could come from this fortune as greed fills his head, but as he tries to carry out this plan, the good wealth also brings destruction to his family as he treats Juana poorly and is abusive. Though Kino desires good for his family, there is a paradox of an evil reality that he does not want. Kino tries to “avoid life’s inevitable tension” between these two but he finds that he cannot separate the good and the evil. In the end, the finding of the great prize causes him to lose another, his son.

Perseverance – The theme of perseverance is demonstrated by many characters, but mainly Kino. Before he found the pearl, he was  a noble and a very determined person who sought fortune for his family. After he finds it, he is hoping to find it in a different way. Because Kino believes that this would save his family, he persists “though many obstacles” that accompany the pearl. He perseveres to keep the pearl but, in the end, it was not worth keeping.

Characters
Kino is a hard-working pearl-diver and the protagonist of the novella. He has a wife, Juana, and a son, Coyotito. He is content with his lifestyle as a diver and possesses nothing of value until he discovers the pearl. After finding the pearl, Kino gradually changes to become a completely different man. Though his family is still the center of his actions, he is also driven by his dreams of an escape from their poverty and a desire to give his son a better future. He quickly becomes obsessed with the material things that the pearl could bring. He is no longer content with his son being uneducated, or his family not being well-dressed. Instead of enjoying his family and their company, as he did in the beginning, he becomes discontent and always seeks more. He is also driven by his desire not to be cheated or slighted. Kino is named for the missionary Eusebio Kino.

Juana, Kino’s wife, is a secondary character. She is a loving woman who cares for her husband and son. Throughout the experience, she remains loyal to her family but also perceives the evil forces that the valuable pearl attracts. For example, two nights after the pearl is found, she attempts to throw it back into the ocean to bring back peace and happiness to her family.

Coyotito is Juana and Kino’s infant son. He is their only child, and his parents do everything they can to protect him. Despite his parents’ love and effort, he is subject to much harm, both before and after the pearl is found.

The Doctor, unnamed in the novella, is a symbol of wealth, greed and exploitation. He is repulsive, fat, and also foreign-born, a native of France. Before the pearl is found, he refuses to heal Coyotito because the family is poor, though it would be easy for him to do so. After Kino finds the pearl, he personally visits the family at home, acting much friendlier than at their first meeting and even pretending to heal Coyotito's scorpion sting with ammonia.  During the doctor's visit, he tries to determine from Kino's glances where in the house the pearl may be hidden, though Kino is too suspicious to reveal anything. The doctor's behavioral changes foreshadow the more serious troubles that begin after Kino's discovery of the pearl.

Juan Tomas, Kino’s brother, is wise and loyal. He is the only other character in the book to suspect the manipulation undertaken by the pearl dealers. When destruction does come, Juan Tomas does not turn away his brother but, instead, welcomes him in and  protects him. He is one of the few characters that does not seek to gain from the pearl and shows he values the importance of family ties.

Apolonia is the wife of Juan Tomas who helps his brother in protecting and hiding Kino.

The pearl dealers, like the doctor, symbolize the exploitation of the native population, this time by the organized pearl-dealing cartel for which the dealers work. When Kino tries to sell the pearl, the pearl dealers claim that the pearl's size makes it worthless and offer Kino a fraction of the pearl's true worth. Kino's outrage at their barehanded lies cause him to brave the dangerous trip to the capital and seek a better price. 

The thieves and trackers are shadowy figures who attack Kino from the first night he has the pearl. Kino never recognizes who they are. They harass and then follow the family right to the end of the story. They force Kino to fight and kill to defend himself and his family and keep the pearl his own. In the final scenes, in which Kino is tracked by a posse, it is not clear in the text whether the group are thieves or law enforcement officers hunting Kino for his killing of the man on the beach.

Reception and analysis 

Several publications praised the novel as a "major artistic triumph" and emphasizes how Steinbeck understands "the universal significance of life." The Pearl is often used to teach students about literature and is also used to discuss important lessons about life. Many believe the book is the easiest of Steinbeck's books to teach because the lessons are simple, yet significant, so, generally, students in middle school or early high school study this novel.  Teachers instruct their students to delve deeper than surface level to learn about both the simplicity and complexity of the novel, and emphasize its themes to allow students to learn more than just literacy.

Jackson Benson writes, The Pearl was heavily influenced by Steinbeck's interest in the philosophy of Carl Jung. Steinbeck wrote that he created the story of The Pearl to address the themes of "human greed, materialism, and the inherent worth of a thing."

Influences
Fleming and John's song "The Pearl" is based on this story.

The American composer Andrew Boysen's Concerto for Trombone and Wind Symphony (2004) was inspired by The Pearl.

References

Further reading

External links
 

1947 American novels
American novellas
American novels adapted into films
Fondo de Cultura Económica books
The Pearl
Heinemann (publisher) books
La Paz Municipality (Baja California Sur)
Novels by John Steinbeck
Novels set in Mexico
Viking Press books